Saint-Jouin-Bruneval is a commune in the Seine-Maritime department in the Normandy region in northern France.

Geography
France's 2nd largest oil-tanker port (built 1973-1975) and oil depot of ‘’Havre-Antifer’’ is entirely within the borders of the commune.

History
During World War II, Operation Biting (also known as the Bruneval Raid) was a successful Combined Operations raid to capture components of a German Würzburg radar set at La Poterie-Cap-d'Antifer and evacuated by the Bruneval beach on 27/28 February 1942.

Population

See also
 Communes of the Seine-Maritime department

References

External links

Official commune website 

Saintjouinbruneval
History of telecommunications in France
Telecommunications in World War II